Henry Baetz (July 27, 1830January 2, 1910) was a German American immigrant real estate and insurance agent.  He was the 6th State Treasurer of Wisconsin, served in the American Civil War as a Union Army officer, and was wounded at Gettysburg.

Biography
Baetz was born in Stockhausen, in the Grand Duchy of Hesse (in modern day Germany). He moved to Two Rivers, Wisconsin, in 1853. Later, he moved to Kewaunee, Wisconsin, before settling in Manitowoc, Wisconsin.

Civil War

In 1862, Baetz volunteered for service in the Union Army.  He was commissioned captain on September 9, 1862, of Company F in the German American 26th Wisconsin Infantry Regiment as it organized at Camp Sigel in Milwaukee.  The regiment mustered into service on September 17 and left the state on October 6.  The 26th was ordered to the Eastern Theater and attached to XI Corps in the Army of the Potomac.  Captain Baetz was promoted to major on March 15, 1863, just before the Battle of Chancellorsville.  The regiment was engaged in serious fighting at Chancellorsville, when they were posted on a ridge alongside the 119th New York Infantry Regiment on the right edge of the Union line.  The 26th Wisconsin took 177 casualties during the fighting at Chancellorsville, including their colonel, William H. Jacobs, who was wounded and had to leave the front.  

After Chancellorsville, Lt. Colonel Hans Boebal took command of the regiment, and Major Baetz functioned as his second-in-command.  At the Battle of Gettysburg, the XI Corps was ordered, during the first day of fighting, to proceed north of the city and establish a defensive position on Oak Hill.  Confederates under Robert E. Rodes, however, arrived at the hill first, and XI Corps was forced to establish defensive positions in the field below the hill.  They quickly came under intense fire from Lt. General Richard S. Ewell's Corps advancing from the north.  XI Corps was forced to fall back, and both Major Baetz and Lt. Colonel Boebal were wounded in the fighting and were unable to continue.  Major Baetz resigned from the Army on October 8, 1863, and returned to Wisconsin.

Political career
He was town clerk for Manitowoc in 1857, and was elected Register of Deeds for Manitowoc County in 1858 and 1860. He was elected State Treasurer of Manitowoc County in 1866 and 1868.  In 1868, Baetz was a delegate to the Republican National Convention in Chicago that nominated Ulysses S. Grant for President of the United States. He was elected State Treasurer of Wisconsin in 1869 alongside fellow Gettysburg veteran, Governor Lucius Fairchild, and was re-elected in 1871. He did not seek re-election in 1873. He moved to Milwaukee in 1875 and was the first chief librarian for the Milwaukee Public Library from 1878 to 1880. He returned to state office in 1880 and served as Secretary of the State Board of Immigration from 1880 to 1883.

Baetz died on January 2, 1910.

Electoral history

Wisconsin Treasurer (1869, 1871)

| colspan="6" style="text-align:center;background-color: #e9e9e9;"| General Election, November 2, 1869

| colspan="6" style="text-align:center;background-color: #e9e9e9;"| General Election, November 7, 1871

Wisconsin Treasurer (1875)

| colspan="6" style="text-align:center;background-color: #e9e9e9;"| General Election, November 2, 1875

References

German emigrants to the United States
People from Two Rivers, Wisconsin
People from Kewaunee, Wisconsin
Politicians from Milwaukee
State treasurers of Wisconsin
Wisconsin Republicans
Union Army officers
People of Wisconsin in the American Civil War
Military personnel from Wisconsin
1830 births
1910 deaths
19th-century American politicians